This is a list of winners and nominees of the South Indian International Movie Awards for Best Actress in the Malayalam film(s). The first recipient of this award was Kavya Madhavan at the 1st South Indian International Movie Awards held on 22 June 2012 in Dubai.

Superlatives

Winners and nominations

See also 
 SIIMA for Best Actor – Malayalam
 SIIMA for Best Film – Malayalam

References

Best Actress Malayalam
Awards for actresses